is a former Japanese football player.

Playing career
Shogo Iike played for Sagawa Printing and YSCC Yokohama from 2010 to 2014.

References

External links

1988 births
Living people
Kanagawa University alumni
Association football people from Kanagawa Prefecture
Japanese footballers
J3 League players
Japan Football League players
SP Kyoto FC players
YSCC Yokohama players
Association football forwards